Arthur C. Harman (March 6, 1854 – June 15, 1927) was an American businessman and Democratic politician who served in both houses of the Virginia General Assembly, representing the state capital of Richmond.

Early and family life
Born in Staunton, Virginia to then-Commonwealth's attorney (prosecutor) William Henry Harman and his wife, the former Margaret Susan Garber. His family had a tradition of military service, from his great-great grandfathers John Cunningham and George Moffett during the American Revolutionary War. His father served in the Virginia militia and U.S. Army during the Mexican-American War. During the American Civil War his father became an officer in the Virginia militia and Confederate States Army, helped to seize the Harpers Ferry arsenal and later died at the Battle of Waynesboro. Three uncles also served as Confederate officers, two under CSA General Stonewall Jackson; his uncle CSA Lt. L.T. Harman died of typhoid fever in the conflict. His other uncles became prominent in rebuilding Virginia's railroads. Harman would graduate from the Virginia Military Institute in 1874.

In 1891, Harman married Rachel Primrose Cochran, also of Staunton, and they had a daughter, Margaret Harman Moore (1894-1919)

Career

The Harmans made Richmond their home, where A.C. Harman had a career in real estate. He also become president of the board of directors of the Virginia Penitentiary.

Following adoption of the Virginia Constitution of 1901 by the General Assembly without a referendum, Harman ran as a Democrat (and member of the Martin organization, later the Byrd Organization) to represent the City of Richmond in the Virginia House of Delegates. He won one of five seats allocated to the city, as one of three new delegates, veterans Elben C. Folkes and S.L. Kelley winning re-election. In 1903, voters elected Harman and George Wayne Anderson as the City of Richmond's two part-time representatives in the Virginia Senate (and five different men to represent them in the House of Delegates). Elben C. Folkes would replace Anderson as the other Richmond state senator in 1908, then James E. Cannon replaced Folkes in 1914 By 1922, senators elected their former fellow Harman to be their sergeant at arms.

Death and legacy

Arthur C. Harman died on June 15, 1927, survived for almost two years by his widow. Both are buried at Hollywood Cemetery.

References

External links
 

1854 births
1927 deaths
Democratic Party Virginia state senators
Virginia Military Institute alumni
Politicians from Staunton, Virginia
20th-century American politicians